Rochester is a city in the U.S. state of New York, the seat of Monroe County, and the fourth-most populous in the state after New York City, Buffalo, and Yonkers, with a population of 211,328 at the 2020 United States census. Located in Western New York, the city of Rochester forms the core of a larger metropolitan area with a population of 1 million people, across six counties. The city was one of the United States' first boomtowns, initially due to the fertile Genesee River Valley, which gave rise to numerous flour mills, and then as a manufacturing center, which spurred further rapid population growth.

Rochester rose to prominence as the birthplace and home of some of America's most iconic companies, in particular Eastman Kodak, Xerox, and Bausch & Lomb (along with Wegmans, Gannett, Paychex, Western Union, French's, Constellation Brands, Ragú, and others), by which the region became a global center for science, technology, and research and development. This status has been aided by the presence of several internationally renowned universities (notably the University of Rochester and Rochester Institute of Technology) and their research programs; these schools, along with many other smaller colleges, have played an increasingly large role in Greater Rochester's economy. Rochester has also played a key part in US history as a hub for certain important social and political movements, especially abolitionism and the women's rights movement.

Today, Rochester's economy is defined by technology and education (aided by a highly educated workforce, research institutions, and other strengths born in its past). While the city experienced some significant population loss as a result of deindustrialization, strong growth in the education and healthcare sectors boosted by elite universities and the slower decline of bedrock companies such as Eastman Kodak and Xerox (as opposed to the rapid fall of heavy industry with steel companies in Buffalo and Pittsburgh) resulted in a much less severe contraction than in most Rust Belt metro areas. The Rochester metropolitan area is the third-largest regional economy in New York, after the New York City metropolitan area and the Buffalo-Niagara Falls Metropolitan Area. Rochester's gross metropolitan product is US$50.6 billion—above those of Albany and Syracuse, but below that of Buffalo.

Rochester is also known for its culture, in particular its music culture; institutions such as the Eastman School of Music (considered to be one of the most prestigious conservatories in the world) and the Rochester International Jazz Festival anchor a vibrant music industry, ranked as one of the top-10 music scenes in the US in terms of the concentration of musicians and music-related business. It is the site of multiple major festivals every year (such as the Lilac Festival, the aforementioned Jazz Festival, the Rochester Fringe Festival, and others that draw hundreds of thousands of attendees each) and is home to several world-famous museums such as The Strong National Museum of Play and the George Eastman Museum, which houses the oldest photography collection in the world and one of the largest.

The Rochester metro is ranked highly in terms of livability and quality of life and is often considered to be one of the best places in America for families due to low cost of living, highly ranked public schools and a low unemployment rate. It is considered to be a global city, ranked by the Globalization and World Cities Research Network as having sufficiency status.

History

The Seneca tribe of the Iroquois Confederacy lived in and around Rochester until losing claim to the area in the Treaty of Big Tree in 1797.

Nineteenth century
Rochester's development followed the American Revolution, and forced cession of their territory by the Iroquois after Britain's defeat. Allied with the British, four major Iroquois tribes were forced out of New York. As a reward for their loyalty to the British crown, they were given a large land grant on the Grand River in Canada.

Rochester was founded shortly after the American Revolution by a wave of English-Puritan-descended immigrants from New England, who were looking for new agricultural land. They were the dominant cultural group in Rochester for over a century. On November 8, 1803, Colonel Nathaniel Rochester (1752–1831), Major Charles Carroll, and Colonel William Fitzhugh, Jr. (1761–1839), all of Hagerstown, Maryland, purchased a 100-acre (40-ha) tract from the state in western New York along the Genesee River. They chose the site because its three cataracts on the Genesee offered great potential for water power. Beginning in 1811, and with a population of 15, the three founders surveyed the land and laid out streets and tracts. In 1817, the Brown brothers and other landowners joined their lands with the Hundred Acre Tract to form the village of Rochesterville.

By 1821, Rochesterville was the seat of Monroe County. Also in 1823, the Erie Canal aqueduct over the Genesee River was completed, and the Erie Canal east to the Hudson River was opened. In the early 20th century, after the advent of railroads, the presence of the canal in the center city was an obstacle; it was rerouted south of Rochester by 1918 when the Barge Canal was completed. By 1830, Rochester's population was 9,200, and in 1834, it was rechartered as a city.

Rochester was first known as "the Young Lion of the West", and then as the "Flour City". By 1838, it was the largest flour-producing city in the United States. Having doubled its population in only 10 years, Rochester became America's first "boom town".

In 1830–31, Rochester experienced one of the nation's biggest Protestant revivalist movements, led by Charles Grandison Finney. The revival inspired other revivals of the Second Great Awakening. A leading pastor in New York, who was converted in the Rochester meetings, gave this account of Finney's meetings there: "The whole community was stirred. Religion was the topic of conversation in the house, in the shop, in the office, and on the street. The only theater in the city was converted into a livery stable; the only circus into a soap and candle factory. Grog shops were closed; the Sabbath was honored; the sanctuaries were thronged with happy worshippers; a new impulse was given to every philanthropic enterprise; the fountains of benevolence were opened, and men lived to good."

By the mid-19th century, as the center of the wheat-processing industry moved west with population and agriculture, the city became home to an expanding nursery business, giving rise to the city's second nickname, the Flower City. Nurseries ringed the city, the most famous of which was started in 1840 by immigrants George Ellwanger from Germany and Patrick Barry from Ireland. Horticulturalist, businessman, writer and seedsman James Vick used innovative mass marketing and regular customer correspondence to build one of the largest and most respected seed companies in the United States. Vick's extensive flower garden on East Avenue was a showplace and weekend destination for local residents. The location of the garden is now bounded by Vick Park A and Vick Park B. 

In 1847, Frederick Douglass founded the abolitionist newspaper, the North Star in Rochester. A former slave and an antislavery speaker and writer, he gained a circulation over 4,000 readers in the United States, Europe, and the Caribbean. The North Star served as a forum for abolitionist views. The Douglass home burnt down in 1872, but a marker for it is in Highland Park off South Avenue.

Susan B. Anthony, a national leader of the women's suffrage movement, was from Rochester. The Nineteenth Amendment to the United States Constitution, in 1920, which guaranteed the right of women to vote, was known as the Susan B. Anthony Amendment because of her work toward its passage, which she did not live to see. Anthony's home is a National Historic Landmark known as the National Susan B. Anthony Museum and House.

At the end of the 19th century, anarchist Emma Goldman lived and worked in Rochester for several years, championing the cause of labor in Rochester sweatshops. Rochester also had significant unrest in labor, race, and antiwar protests.

After the Civil War, Rochester had an expansion of new industries in the late 19th century, founded by migrants to the city, including inventor and entrepreneur George Eastman, who founded Eastman Kodak, and German immigrants John Jacob Bausch and Henry Lomb, who launched Bausch & Lomb in 1861. Not only did they create new industries, but Eastman also became a major philanthropist, developing and endowing the University of Rochester, its Eastman School of Music, and other local institutions.

Twentieth century
In the early 20th century, Rochester became a center of the garment industry, particularly men's fashions. It was the base of Bond Clothing Stores, Fashion Park Clothes, Hickey Freeman, and Stein-Bloch and Co. Carriagemaker James Cunningham and Sons founded the pioneer automobile company Cunningham.

The population reached 62,386 in 1870, 162,608 in 1900, and 295,750 in 1920. By 1950, the population had reached a high of 332,488. In 1950, the Census Bureau reported Rochester's population as 97.6% White and 2.3% Black. With industrial restructuring in the later 20th century, and the decline of industry and jobs in the area, by 2018, the city's population had declined to 206,284 (although the metropolitan area was considerably larger) with 46.58% recorded as White and 40.71% as Black or African American.

Rochester's black population tripled to more than 25,000 during the 1950s. Casually employed by the city's iconic industries, most African Americans in the city held low-pay and low-skill jobs, and lived in substandard housing.  Discontent exploded in the 1964 Rochester race riot. Triggered by the attempted arrest of a 19-year-old intoxicated black male at a street block party, order was restored after three days, and only after Governor Nelson Rockefeller called out the New York National Guard. By the time the disturbance was over, five were dead (four in a helicopter crash) and 350 were injured. Almost a thousand people were arrested and 204 stores were either looted or damaged.

In the wake of the riots, the Rochester Area Churches, together with black civil rights leaders, invited Saul Alinsky of the Industrial Areas Foundation to help the community organize. With the Reverend Franklin Florence, who had been close to Malcolm X, they established FIGHT (Freedom, Integration, God, Honor, Today), which successfully brought pressure to bear on Eastman Kodak to help open up employment and city governance.

Geography

Rochester is located at  (43.165496, −77.611504) in Upstate New York. The Genesee River bisects the city.

Rochester's geography was formed by the ice sheets during the Pleistocene epoch. The retreating ice sheets reached a standstill at what is now the southern border of the city, melting at the same rate as they were advancing, depositing sediment along the southern edge of the ice mass. This created a line of hills, including (from west to east) Mt. Hope, the hills of Highland Park, Pinnacle Hill, and Cobb's Hill. Because the sediment of these hills was deposited into a proglacial lake, they are stratified and classified as a "kame delta". A brief retreat and readvance of the ice sheet onto the delta deposited unstratified material there, creating a rare hybrid structure called "kame moraine".

The ice sheets also created Lake Ontario (one of the five freshwater Great Lakes), the Genesee River with its waterfalls and gorges, Irondequoit Bay, Sodus Bay, Braddock Bay, Mendon Ponds, numerous local streams and ponds, the Ridge, and the nearby Finger Lakes.

Rochester has  of public streets,  of water mains, 44 vehicular and eight pedestrian bridges, 11 public libraries, two police stations (one for the east side, one for the west), and 15 firehouses. The principal source of water is Hemlock Lake, which, with its watershed, is owned by the state of New York. Other water sources include Canadice Lake and Lake Ontario. The 30-year annual average snowfall is just above . The high amount of snow Rochester receives can be accounted for by the city's proximity to Lake Ontario (see lake-effect snow).

Neighborhoods

Rochester has a number of neighborhoods, including the 19th Ward, 14621 Community, Beechwood, Browncroft, Cascade District, Cobbs Hill, Charlotte, Corn Hill, Dewey, Dutchtown, Edgerton, Ellwanger-Barry, German Village, Grove Place, High Falls District, Highland Park, Maplewood (10th Ward), Marketview Heights, Mt. Read, North Winton Village, North of East Main Neighbors United, Neighborhood of the Arts , Lyell-Otis, Park Avenue, Plymouth-Exchange, Southwest, East End, South Wedge, Swillburg, Susan B. Anthony, university-Atlantic, Upper Monroe, and more are all recognized communities with various neighborhood associations. Also, living spaces are available in downtown Rochester.

Browncroft
The Browncroft neighborhood is built on the former nursery grounds of the Brown Brothers nursery. The business district situated on Winton Rd has a mix of restaurants and shops. The neighborhood borders the nearby Tryon and Ellison Parks. The Browncroft Historic District was listed on the National Register of Historic Places in 2004.

Lyell-Otis
Historically an Italian-American neighborhood, this area of the City of Rochester is now home to citizens from across the globe.  There have recently been efforts to improve the quality of life in this neighborhood, as the area has opportunity for redevelopment and renewal.

The Lyell-Otis neighborhood is in the City of Rochester,  in the Northwest Quadrant. Bordering the suburbs of Gates and Greece, the Lyell-Otis boundaries are the Erie Canal (the City Line) on the west, Lyell Avenue on the south, Driving Park Boulevard on the north, and the old subway bed (long since filled-in, which previously was where the Erie Canal flowed) on the east - almost to Dewey Avenue.

19th Ward
The 19th Ward is a southwest neighborhood bordered by Genesee Street, West Avenue, and the Erie Canal, and is across the river from the University of Rochester. Now known by its slogan "Urban by Choice", in the early 19th century, the area was known as Castle Town, after Castle Inn, a tavern run by Colonel Isaac Castle. By the early 1820s, however, the area was overshadowed by developments in the north that would become downtown Rochester. Due to a tumultuous bend in the Genesee, the area was home to skilled boatsmen who assisted boats traveling north to Rochester and the area was consequently known during this time as "The Rapids". In the 1890s, as Rochester expanded, the area became a prosperous residential area that thrived as the city grew. By 1930, it was a booming residential area for doctors, lawyers, and skilled workers; it includes the still prestigious Sibley Tract development. Homes in the originally upper-class neighborhood typically have gumwood trim, leaded glass, fireplaces, hardwood floors, and open porches. In the 1960s, property values fell as the population of Rochester did, the area experienced white flight accelerated by school busing, blockbusting, and race riots downtown, and crime increased, with violence, drug use, and neglected property further diminishing property values.

To respond to these issues, the 19th Ward has had an active community association since 1965 and is now known for its ethnic, class, and cultural diversity. The "Brooks Landing" development along the Genesee River at the former "rapids" is bringing new economic development to the community, including an 88-room hotel,  office building,  of new retail, two restaurants, and Brue Coffee shop.  Residential development is also increasing with completion of a 170-bed University of Rochester student housing tower at Brooks Landing in 2014, and 29 new market-rate homes nearby.

Located in the 19th Ward are the Arvine Heights Historic District, Chili–West Historic District, Inglewood and Thurston Historic District, and Sibley–Elmdorf Historic District, listed on the National Register of Historic Places.

Charlotte

Charlotte (shar-LOT) is a lakefront community in Rochester bordering Lake Ontario. It is home to Ontario Beach Park, commonly known as Charlotte Beach, which is a popular summer destination for Rochesterians. A new terminal was built in 2004 for the Rochester-to-Toronto ferry service and was later sold after the ferry ceased operations in 2005. The Port of Rochester terminal still exists and has since been revamped. It now houses the restaurant California Rollin', a coffee shop named The Nutty Bavarian along with offices for the marina created around it. In summer 2016 a proposed redevelopment project for the Port of Rochester was put on hold due to the developers failing to meet financial obligations as set by the city.

Susan B. Anthony Neighborhood
This neighborhood is a Preservation District on the National Register of Historic Places, known as the Madison Square-West Main Street Historic District.  It encompasses a three-and-one-half block area within walking distance from downtown Rochester, and comprises residential, commercial and industrial buildings. The center of the residential area is Susan B. Anthony Square, a  park shown on city maps from 1839, which was designed by the famous Olmstead Brothers. Also within the neighborhood is the Susan B. Anthony House, which was the suffragist's residence for the last decades of her life, now a museum, as well as the Cunningham Carriage factory built in 1848 on Canal Street. James Cunningham Son & Co. sold more carriages in the United States in the 1880s than all other manufacturers combined. The Canal Street property, which still stands, remained Cunningham's headquarters for more than 100 years.

Swillburg
This wedge-shaped piece of the city is bordered by S. Clinton Avenue on the west, Field St on the south, and Interstate 490 on the east. The neighborhood received its moniker when a 19th-century Rochester pig farmer utilized the area to collect swill for his swine. The area has one of the highest rates of home-ownership in the city.

The local elementary school is #35, Field Street, which often sponsors a community garden in its courtyard on Pinnacle Street.

Marketview Heights
Running east from Union Street just north of Main Street, Marketview Heights is best known as the location of the Public Market, which offers a variety of groceries and other goods from marketeers from farms and shops from surrounding areas, primarily on the weekends.

Homestead Heights
Homestead Heights is in northeast Rochester. It is bordered on the west by Goodman Street, on the north by Clifford Avenue, on the south by Bay Street, and on the east by Culver Road, which is also the border between the city and the town of Irondequoit. The neighborhood is a mix of residential and commercial. Real estate values are higher on the eastern end of the neighborhood near the Irondequoit border. The neighborhood is approximately 2–2 miles west of the Irondequoit Bay.

Climate

Rochester lies in the humid continental climate zone (Köppen Dfa) and has four distinct seasons. However, Rochester receives vast amounts of snow (primarily lake effect snow resulting from its location on the southern shores of Lake Ontario), ranking among the snowiest large cities on earth and occasionally setting records for annual snowfall among large US metros. Spring sees plentiful rain with the rising temperatures, and occasional late snowstorms depending on the year. Summers are warm and sunny; there are occasional short periods of high heat and humidity but in general, Rochester is set apart from most of the continental US by comparatively cool, comfortable summers (ranking among the top five coolest summers among large metros alongside Seattle, Portland, Oregon, and neighboring Buffalo). Autumn features brilliant foliage colors, cooling temperatures and occasionally an excess of rain depending on the year, though precipitation is generally plentiful and dispersed fairly evenly throughout the year.

Demographics

Population 
As of the 2020 Census, the population of Rochester was 211,328. Like most Rust Belt cities, the city has experienced a sustained population decline over the last 60 years. In 2020, for the first time in 200 years, Rochester dropped to fourth most populous city in the state behind Yonkers.

Race, disability, and income 

As of the 2020 United States census, Rochester had a population of 211,328, of which 38.0% were non-Hispanic Black, 33.0% were non-Hispanic White, 19.8% were Hispanic/Latino, 3.9% were Asian, 0.2% were Native American or Pacific Islander, and 5.1% were mixed or other.

According to the 2010 census, the city's population was 43.7% White or White American, 41.7% Black, 0.5% American Indian and Alaska Native, 3.1% Asian, 0.0% Native Hawaiian and Other Pacific Islander, 6.6% from some other race, and 4.4% from two or more races. 16.4% of the total population were Hispanic or Latino of any race, mostly made up of Puerto Ricans. Non-Hispanic Whites were 37.6% of the population in 2010, compared to 80.2% in 1970.

Although losing population since 1950, over the course of the past 50 years Rochester has become a major center for immigration, particularly for arrivals from Eastern and Southeastern Europe, sub-Saharan Africa, and the Caribbean. Rochester had the highest percentage of Puerto Ricans of any major city in the United States in 2013, one of the four largest Turkish American communities, one of the largest Jamaican American communities in any major U.S. city and a large concentration of Polish Americans along with nearby Buffalo, New York. Rochester's Bhutanese and Nepalese communities are among the largest (top 3) in the United States, concentrated primarily in Jones Square and Edgerton with growth fueled by recently arrived migrants and refugees. In addition, Rochester was ranked number 9 in the nation for the largest Italian population in the United States in 2018.

In 1997, Rochester was reported to have the largest per capita deaf population in the United States, likely because it is home to the National Technical Institute for the Deaf.

In 2010, of 88,999 households,  30.0% had children under 18 living with them, 25.1% were married couples living together, 23.3% had a female householder with no husband present, and 47.0% were not families. Of all households, 37.1% were made up of individuals, and 9.2% had someone living alone 65 or older. The average household size was 2.36, and the average family size was 3.19. The age distribution was 28.1% under 18, 11.6% from 18 to 24, 32.2% from 25 to 44, 18.1% from 45 to 64, and 10.0% who were 65 or older. The median age was 31. For every 100 females, there were 91.6 males. For every 100 females 18 and over, there were 87.3 males.

The median income for a city household was $27,123, and for a family was $31,257. Males had a median income of $30,521, versus $25,139 for females. The per capita income for the city was $15,588. About 23.4% of families and 25.9% of the population were below the poverty line, including 37.5% of those under age 18 and 15.4% of those age 65 or over.

Religion
By the 1920s and 1930s, Rochester's population was roughly half Protestant and half Catholic, although a significant Jewish population was also present. In 1938, the city had 214 religious congregations, two-thirds of which had been founded after 1880. At that time, the city added, on average, 2.6 new congregations per year, many founded by immigrants from Southern and Eastern Europe. During peak immigration from 1900 to 1920, dozens of churches were established, including four Roman Catholic churches with Italian clergy, three Roman Catholic churches with Slavic clergy, a Greek Orthodox Church, a Polish Baptist church, 15 Jewish synagogues, and four small Italian Protestant mission churches (Baptist, Evangelical, Methodist, and Presbyterian). Additionally,  several Buddhist temples are in the city, one Cambodian, two Lao, and one Vietnamese.

Crime
In 2012, Rochester had 2,061 reported violent crimes, compared to a national average rate of 553.5 violent crimes in cities with populations larger than 100,000. That same year, Rochester had 827 personal-crime incidents and 11,054 property-crime incidents.

In 2018, Rochester reported 28 murders (13.9 per 100,000 residents). In 2012, 95 sexual assaults, 816 robberies, 1,104 aggravated assaults, 2,978 burglaries, 7,694 larceny thefts, 111 forcible rape, 622 auto thefts, and 152 acts of arson occurred.

On November 12, 2021, Rochester Mayor Lovely Warren declared a state of emergency due to a rising violent crime rate in the city. As of November 12, there were 71 reported murders in Rochester so far, making 2021 the deadliest year in the city's recorded history. The Rochester police chief said, to date, 247 local violent offenders have been arrested in 2021, 134 of which for firearms related offenses. Of those arrests, 65 are facing federal prosecution and 61 face state prosecution. According to the police chief, the mayor has reached out to the governor for additional state assistance in the fight against local violence as the police chief said the RPD resources, and the Persons In Crisis Team, have been stretched thin — a request that Governor Kathy Hochul approved, according to The RPD Chief.

On July 21, 2022, Rochester Mayor Malik Evans declared a state of emergency due to ongoing gun violence. Between the beginning of the calendar year and July 21, Rochester recorded 34 homicides in which a gun was involved.

Economy

Rochester is home to a number of Fortune 1000 and international businesses, including Paychex ( Fortune #662), as well as several national and regional companies, such as Carestream Health. Xerox was founded in Rochester in 1906 as the Haloid Company, and retains a significant presence in Rochester, although its headquarters are now in Norwalk, Connecticut. Bausch & Lomb moved to Bridgewater, New Jersey, in 2014. The Gannett newspaper company and Western Union were founded in Rochester by Frank Gannett and Hiram Sibley, respectively, but have since moved to other cities.

The median single-family house price was $135,000 in the second quarter of 2015 in greater Rochester, an increase of 5.4% from a year earlier, according to the National Association of Realtors.

Tech Valley, the technologically recognized area of eastern New York, has spawned a western offshoot into the Rochester and Finger Lakes areas. Since the 2000s, as established companies in Rochester downsized, Rochester and Monroe County's economy has been redirected toward high technology, with new, smaller companies providing the capital necessary for business foundation. The Rochester area is important in the field of photographic processing and imaging, as well as incubating an increasingly diverse high-technology sphere encompassing STEM fields, in part the result of private startup enterprises collaborating with major academic institutions, including the University of Rochester and Cornell University.

Other organizations such as High Tech Rochester provide local startups with mentorship, office space, and other resources.  Given the high prevalence of imaging and optical science among the industry and the universities, Rochester is known as the world capital of imaging. The Institute of Optics of the University of Rochester and the Rochester Institute of Technology in nearby Henrietta have imaging programs. In 2006, the University of Rochester became the Rochester area's largest employer, surpassing the Eastman Kodak Company. 
One food product Rochester calls its own is the "white hot", a variant of the hot dog or smoked bratwurst made by the local Zweigle's company and other companies. Another local specialty is the "Garbage Plate", a trademark of Nick Tahou Hots that traditionally includes macaroni salad, home fries, and two hot dogs or cheeseburgers topped with mustard, onions, and their famous meat hot sauce. Many area restaurants feature copies or variations with the word "plate" commonly used as a general term. Rochester was home to French's Mustard, whose address was 1 Mustard Street.

The Ragú brand of pasta sauce used to be produced in Rochester. Some of the original facility still exists and produces products for other labels (including Newman's Own) as Private Label Foods.

Other local franchises include: Bill Gray's, DiBella's, Tom Wahl's, American Specialty Manufacturing (producers of Boss Sauce), Salvatore's Old Fashioned Pizzeria, Mark's Pizzeria, Cam's Pizzeria, Pontillo's Pizzeria, Perri's Pizzeria, Jeremiah's Tavern, and Abbott's Frozen Custard. Dinosaur Bar-B-Que, which originated in Syracuse, also operates its second franchise downtown in the former Lehigh Valley Railroad station on the Genesee River.

Government and politics

Rochester is governed by a mayor serving as chief executive of city government and a city council consisting of four district members and five at-large members. Rochester has a Strong mayor-council form of government. Mayor Malik Evans was sworn in as mayor at midnight on January 1, 2022. 
The city's police department is the Rochester Police Department.

Neighborhood Service Centers 
Enforcement of property code violations in Rochester had been handled by the Neighborhood Empowerment Team (NET). Rather than using a centralized code-enforcement office, 10 sectors in Rochester were assigned a total of six NET offices by the city government. However,  complaints have been made about the lack of consistency in the manner and severity of enforcement between NET offices. On July 16, 2008, the city announced two of the NET offices would be closed and another relocated, due to what it had found to be the high cost and low value of operating the decentralized network. Following the restructuring, the remaining offices were renamed Neighborhood Service Centers. Now, one office per city quadrant helps resolve quality-of-life issues, works with neighborhood groups, and paves the way for appropriate housing and economic development. Most code enforcement processes were consolidated into the Bureau of Inspection and Compliance within the Department of Neighborhood and Business Development located centrally in City Hall.

Representation at the federal level 
The city is covered by New York's 25th congressional district currently represented by Democrat Joe Morelle of Irondequoit, Monroe County, in Congress. From 1987 until 2018, the city was represented by longtime Democrat Louise M. Slaughter of Fairport, Monroe County, in Congress.

Representation at the state level

New York State Senate 
After redistricting based on the 2010 United States Census, the city was split between three state senate districts:

New York State Assembly 
After redistricting based on the 2010 United States Census, Monroe County was split between three state assembly districts:

Courts 
Rochester is part of
The 7th Judicial District of the New York Supreme Court
The 4th Department of the New York Supreme Court, Appellate Division

Rochester City Court consists of ten full-time judges, each of whom is elected to a 10-year term by the citizens of the City of Rochester.

History

Created in 1876, the Court was initially named the "Municipal Court of the City of Rochester" and had two judges. Originally, city courts throughout the state were self-regulating, and prescribed their own rules of procedure and bounds of jurisdiction. Rochester City Court was governed by the Rochester City Court Act, which was a part of the Charter of the City of Rochester.

In 1935, Judge Jacob Gitelman introduced weekend sentencing. He was the first judge in New York State to do so. In 1964, the New York State Constitution was amended to require uniform jurisdiction, practice, and procedure for the city courts, to be regulated by the state legislature.

The court's first African-American judge, Reuben K. Davis, was appointed to the city court bench in March 1967.

In the 1980s, the court heard cases involving the prosecution of the "Topfree Seven," women who intentionally bared their chests once a year in order to protest the criminalization of female nudity. Judge Herman J. Walz  ruled that the women could not be prosecuted under New York's public nudity statute because their act of going topless in order to protest the law was imbued with First Amendment protections. The decision was later affirmed by the New York Court of Appeals.

By 1995, Rochester City Court had eight judges. A ninth was added in 2001. The Court was brought to its current complement of ten judges in 2014

Jurisdiction

In New York State, the 61 city courts outside of New York City handle the arraignment of felonies, try misdemeanors and lesser offenses, and try civil lawsuits involving claims of up to $15,000. Rochester City Court also hears small claims matters up to $5,000. Rules of practice and procedure within all city courts are prescribed by the Uniform City Court Act.

Rochester City Court, like all city courts, follows the individual assignment system ("IAS"). This means that each case is assigned to a judge when the case is first initiated, and, with a few exceptions, stays under the supervision of that particular judge until the case is resolved.

The New York State Unified Court System is a unified state court system that functions under the Chief Judge of the New York Court of Appeals who is the  Chief Judge of New York. All city courts throughout the state are part of the Unified Court System.

Judges
Each judge must be a city resident and must have been an attorney in New York for at least five years. Judges have a mandatory retirement age of 70. Vacancies on the court are filled by the mayor, and judges so appointed must run for a full term at the next general election.

Former notable judges
 Marjorie Byrnes, member of the New York State Assembly.
 Frank P. Geraci Jr., a federal judge in the Western District of New York.

Representation at the county level 

Rochester is represented by districts 7, 16, and 21–29 in the Monroe County legislature (a 29-seat body with legislators elected to two-year terms). Rochester is also under the jurisdiction of the county executive (currently Democrat Adam Bello) along with the rest of Monroe County. The District Attorney is also elected at the county level along with several other offices (such as Sheriff and Clerk) which in part govern the city.

Politics

Historical
Rochester has played an important role in both regional and national politics at various points over the past 150 years (particularly as a hub for American Progressivism and sweeping social and cultural movements). It was one of the key centers of Abolitionism and a top destination for freed and escaped slaves, most notably Frederick Douglass, who settled in Rochester and did most of his work and writings there, including publishing The North Star. Many other prominent abolitionists hailed from and/or operated in the area, such as Thomas James, Austin Stewart and many others.

Around the same time, Rochester and the wider Finger Lakes region was the birthplace of the Women's Suffrage movement. A critical suffragettes' convention was held in 1848 in nearby Seneca Falls, and Rochester was the home base of Susan B. Anthony (the most prominent American leader in the fight for women's voting rights) along with other notable Suffragettes like Elizabeth Cady Stanton, Abigail Bush and Amy Post. The city itself played host to the Rochester Women's Rights Convention in 1848.

The dawn of the 20th century in Rochester saw rapid growth, driven in large part by waves of immigrants arriving from Ireland, Italy, Poland and elsewhere which (as in other American cities) had a major impact on the political landscape. The surge in new arrivals, along with increased industrialization resulted in the city becoming a hotbed of labor activism. From the 1920s and continuing into the post-war era Rochester grew into a power center for newly formed industrial unions, which steadily began accumulating influence within local and state government. It was only one of a very few American cities where the labor movement was powerful enough to mount a General Strike (and one of even fewer where it was successful) when in 1946 when an estimated 50,000 workers across multiple sectors walked off in support of hundreds of city employees fired for attempting to unionize. After that point local unions played a decisive role in area politics, primarily by partnering with the area Democratic Party.

Later, Rochester saw the arrival of a great many black southerners as part of the Great Migration and large numbers of Hispanics (primarily from Puerto Rico. This coincided with White flight, leading to dramatic changes in the social, cultural and demographic makeup of Rochester (changes that were reflected in the city's politics). Racism, Segregation, Redlining and similar problems caused a great deal of racial tension and resentment, culminating in the 1964 Rochester race riot (as well as the city's black community playing a role in the national Civil rights movement).

Present day
The ethnic and economic makeup of Metro Rochester (with poorer blacks, Hispanics and Asian-Americans heavily concentrated either within the city proper or a few inner-ring suburbs and wealthier white residents predominantly in the suburbs) continues to impact the area's modern day political situation. Like in many other large American cities, traditionally the city government has been completely dominated by the Democratic Party whereas the suburbs have reliably voted for Republican officials (at least on the local and state level). In recent decades the result of this has almost always been Democratic control of city government, Republican control of county government and Rochester's state senate seats and Democratic control of Rochester's primary congressional district (with a similar overall pattern in area state assembly districts). Fusion Voting has allowed several third parties to have some impact on the local and state level; the Working Families Party plays a role particularly in city politics, and the Conservative Party endorses candidates primarily in the suburbs. 
 
In recent years, the urban area's traditional partisan dynamic appears to have begun shifting in the Democratic Party's favor (see Blue Wave). A Democrat won the 2017 race for county sheriff for the first time in decades, in 2019 Democrat Adam Bello was elected county executive after over 30 years of Republican control, in 2020 democrats Samra Brouk and Jeremy Cooney flipped state senate districts long held by the GOP and the traditionally Republican county legislature is now split 15–14. It is not possible to say whether or not this trend will continue; though it is in keeping with a broader national trend of increased Democratic success in suburban areas.

Fire department
Rochester is protected by about 500 professional firefighters in the Rochester Fire Department (RFD). It is the third-largest fire department in the state of New York. It operates from 16 fire stations throughout the city, under the command of two battalion chiefs and a deputy chief per shift. The department operates 13 engines, six ladders, one heavy rescue, two hazardous material units, a fireboat, and a salvage unit (Rochester Protectives), as well as many other special and support units. Usually, 87 front-line members work each shift, including chief officers and fire investigation (not including staff divisions such as Fire Safety, the Training Academy, and Supply Depot). RFD responds to around 40,000 emergency calls annually. Around 90% of RFD personnel are certified NY State EMTs and roughly 50% of the calls each year are for EMS. The RFD also operates its own apparatus repair division at the Public Safety Training Facility. The chief of department is Willie Jackson.

Education
The City of Rochester is served by the Rochester City School District, which encompasses all public primary and secondary education. The district is governed by a popularly elected seven-member board of education. Also, parochial and private primary and secondary schools are located within the city. Rochester City Schools consistently post below-average results when compared to the rest of New York, although on-time graduation rates have improved significantly during the past three years. However, the high-school graduation rate for African-American males is lower in Rochester than in any city in the United States (9%). Rochester also offers 15 free public charter schools with 26 locations serving students K–12.

Colleges and universities

Rochester and the surrounding region host a high concentration of colleges and universities, which drive much of the economic growth in the five-county area. The University of Rochester is the only large research institution primarily within the city limits, although Monroe Community College and SUNY Brockport operate campuses downtown. The Highland Park neighborhood is home to Colgate Rochester Crozer Divinity School (part of whose facility is leased by Ithaca College's Department of Physical Therapy) and an office maintained by the Cornell University School of Industrial and Labor Relations.

University of Rochester

The University of Rochester is the metropolitan area's oldest and most prominent institution of higher learning, and one of the country's top research centers. It was ranked as the 34th-best university in the nation by U.S. News & World Report for 2021 and was deemed "one of the new Ivies" by Newsweek. The nursing school has received many awards and honors and the Simon School of Business is also ranked in the top 30 in many categories.

The university is also home to the Eastman School of Music, which was ranked the number-one music school in America. It was founded and endowed by George Eastman in his years as a philanthropist. He also contributed greatly to the University of Rochester from wealth based on the success of Eastman Kodak.

Former colleges
Four institutions began operations in the city and later moved to Rochester's inner-ring suburbs:
The Empire State College Rochester Learning Center moved from its Prince Street address to Irondequoit in 1999.
Monroe Community College moved from Alexander Street to Brighton in 1968.
Rochester Institute of Technology moved from South Washington Street to Henrietta, also in 1968.
St. Bernard's School of Theology and Ministry moved from space leased in Colgate Rochester Crozer Divinity School to Pittsford in 2003.

Rochester was the host of the Barleywood Female University, a short-lived women's college from 1852 to 1853. The Lutheran seminary that became Wagner College was established in the city in 1883 and remained for some 35 years before moving to Staten Island.

Secondary education 
The Rochester City School District operates 13 public secondary schools, each serving grades 7–12. In addition, six charter secondary schools operate.

 Benjamin Franklin High School
 Charlotte High School
 Dr. Freddie Thomas High School
 East High School
 Frederick Douglass Preparatory School
 All City High
 James Monroe High School
 Nathaniel Rochester Community School
 Northwest College Preparatory School
 School of Business, Finance and Entrepreneurship at Edison
 School of Engineering and Manufacturing at Edison
 School of Imaging and Information Technology at Edison
 School of Applied Technology at Edison
 School of the Arts
 School Without Walls
 Thomas Jefferson High School
 Wilson Magnet High School

Charter schools

Rochester is home to a number of charter schools, serving grades Kindergarten - 12.

Private schools
McQuaid Jesuit
Aquinas Institute
Bishop Kearny

Former schools
 Nazareth Academy 
John Marshall High School

Culture and recreation

The city of Rochester is home to numerous cultural institutions. These include the Garth Fagan Dance, the Rochester Philharmonic Orchestra, the Rochester City Ballet, George Eastman Museum International Museum of Photography and Film, Memorial Art Gallery, Rochester Contemporary Art Center, Rochester Museum & Science Center, the Rochester Broadway Theater League, Strong National Museum of Play, the Strasenburgh Planetarium, Hochstein School of Music & Dance, the Auditorium Theater, and numerous arts organizations. Geva Theatre Center is the city's largest professional theater.

The East End Theater is on East Main Street in the theater district. The Rochester Association of Performing Arts is a non-profit organization that provides educational theater classes to the community.

Nightlife
Rochester's East End district, located downtown, is well known as the center of the city's nightlife. It is the stopping point for East Avenue, which along with the surrounding streets is occupied by nightclubs, lounges, coffee shops, bars, and high-end restaurants. The Eastman School of Music, one of the top musical institutes in the nation, and its auditorium are also within the neighborhood. The Eastman Theatre is host to the Rochester Philharmonic Orchestra and other musical/drama events.

There are other, smaller enclaves of after-hours activity scattered across the city. "Southeast" is the center of Rochester's prosperous arts scene, particularly in and around the Park Avenue neighborhood (which is known for its many coffee shops, cafes, bistros and boutique shops). Nearby on University Avenue can be found several plazas, like the Village Gate, which give space to contemporary bars, restaurants and art galleries that stay open late into the night. Monroe Avenue, several streets over, is filled with pubs, small restaurants, smoke shops, theaters and several clubs as well as cigar bars and hookah lounges. These neighborhoods are home to many artists, musicians, students, and Rochester's large LGBT community.

The South Wedge district, directly south of downtown, has seen significant gentrification in recent years and now is the site of many modern cafes and bars that serve the student community attending the University of Rochester several blocks away from the neighborhoods. The "Wedge" is quickly becoming one of the most vibrant areas within the city limits; its numerous nightspots keep the streets active with college students and young professionals, many of whom live there due to the abundance of affordable housing and proximity to many of the region's major hospitals, parks, and colleges.

Park lands
Rochester's parks include Highland, Cobb's Hill, Durand Eastman, Genesee Valley, Maplewood, Edgerton, Seneca, Turning Point, and Ontario Beach; four of these were designed by landscape architect Frederick Law Olmsted. The city's Victorian-era Mt. Hope Cemetery includes the final resting places of Susan B. Anthony, Frederick Douglass, George B. Selden, and many others. Other scenic sites are Holy Sepulchre and neighboring Riverside Cemetery.

Throughout its history, Rochester has acquired several nicknames; it has been known as "the World's Image Center", "the Flour City", "the Flower City". As a legacy of its time as "The Flower City", Rochester hosts a Lilac Festival for ten days every May, when nearly 400 varieties of lilacs bloom, and 100,000 visitors arrive.

Festivals
Rochester hosts a number of cultural festivals every year, including:
Established in 2002, the Rochester International Jazz Festival is one of the largest jazz festivals in America. It takes place in late June at dozens of clubs, concert halls and free outdoor stages throughout Downtown Rochester; past performers include Herbie Hancock, Sonny Rollins, Dave Brubeck, Oscar Peterson, Chick Corea, and Wynton Marsalis. A record 205,000 people attended the event in 2016
The 360 365 Film Festival (formerly the Rochester High-Falls International Film Festival) held at the George Eastman House's Dryden Theatre and the Little Theatre downtown. Several films screened at 360/365 have been honored at the Golden Globes and the Academy Awards.
Rochester International Film Festival, the world's oldest continuously held short-film festival
The Lilac Festival at Highland Park, which is the oldest and most popular festival in Rochester and the largest event of its kind in North America, attended by over 500,000 people annually. Established in 1898, it includes multiple attractions aside from the lilacs themselves. These musical acts include the Wailers who attended in 2012 and 2014.
The Rochester Fringe Festival
The Corn Hill Arts Festival

Media

The Democrat and Chronicle, a Gannett newspaper, is Rochester's main daily newspaper. There are numerous other publications and magazines that cater to many of the city's different people groups or special interests such as Insider magazine, City Newspaper, Rochester Business Journal, and the Minority Reporter. Former publications serving the city include the Rochester Post Express and Rochester Evening Journal. Rochester is also served by several local television and radio stations, with WROC-TV as the oldest television station serving the Rochester metro area.

Several movies have been filmed at least in part in Rochester, including The Amazing Spiderman 2 (2013), The Tomorrow Man (2019), and Wonder Boys (2000).

Points of interest

Asbury First United Methodist Church
Blue Cross Arena at the War Memorial
Cinema Theater
Cobbs Hill Park and Reservoir
Eastman Business Park
Ellwanger Garden
First Unitarian Church of Rochester, described by a Pulitzer-Prize-winning architectural critic as one of "the most significant works of religious architecture of the century".
Frederick Douglass Monument
Frontier Field
George Eastman Museum
Geva Theatre Center
High Falls and the High Falls Entertainment District
Highland Park
House of Guitars
Lamberton Conservatory
Liberty Pole
Little Theatre, one of the oldest art-house movie theaters in the country
Maplewood Park Rose Garden
Midtown Plaza, the nation's first downtown shopping mall (partially demolished – Tower and Seneca Building still stand).
Mount Hope Cemetery, Rochester, the nation's first Victorian cemetery
Nick Tahou Hots featuring the Garbage Plate and a charity run in its name
Ontario Beach Park and the Port of Rochester at Charlotte
Rochester Broadway Theatre League at the Auditorium Theatre
Rochester Contemporary Art Center
Rochester's Public Market
Rochester Riverside Convention Center
Rochester Institute of Technology
St. Joseph's Church and Rectory
Seneca Park Zoo, one of the top three family attractions in the area
Strong National Museum of Play, nation's second-largest children's museum housing the National Toy Hall of Fame
Strasenburgh Planetarium, part of the Rochester Museum & Science Center
Susan B. Anthony House
Times Square Building, noted for its 42' tall "Wings of Progress" sculpture.
University Avenue and Park Avenue Artistic Districts
University of Rochester
University of Rochester Arboretum
University of Rochester's Eastman School of Music and Eastman Theatre
Water Street Music Hall

Sports

Rochester was named the top minor league sports market in the country by Street & Smith's Sports Business Journal in July 2005, the number 10 "best golf city" in America by Golf Magazine in 2007, and the fifth-best "sports town" in the country by Scarborough Research in September 2008.

Professional sports
Rochester has several professional sports teams:

In addition, there are numerous other amateur and club sports such as rowing and rugby. Rochester and its surrounding area also has a rich golf history and has hosted numerous professional tournaments on its local golf courses. The city also boasts other facilities such as 13 full-time recreation centers, 19 swimming programs, 3 artificial ice rinks, 66 softball/baseball fields, 47 tennis courts, 5 football fields, 7 soccer fields, and 43 outdoor basketball courts. The Rochester Royals (now the Sacramento Kings) were a professional basketball team in Rochester from 1945 to 1957 with roots as an amateur team dating back to 1923. They won the NBA title in 1951, defeating the New York Knicks in 7 games.

College sports
Rochester is the largest Metropolitan Statistical Area in the U.S. which does not include at least one college or university participating at the NCAA Division I level in all sports. Almost all area college sports are played at the NCAA Division III level. The only exceptions are the RIT men's and women's ice hockey teams, which compete at the Division I level, and the University of Rochester men's squash team, which is consistently ranked top 5 in Division I. RIT and UR's other sports, as well as both institutions as a whole, are in Division III. The men's team made it to the NCAA Frozen Four in 2010 and the women's team won the Division III national championship in 2012, just before switching over to Division I.

As of the 2014–2015 academic year, the only college in the Rochester area not officially classified at the Division III level is Roberts Wesleyan College, which completed its transition from membership in the National Christian College Athletic Association (NCCAA); Roberts Wesleyan was granted full membership in NCAA Division II beginning with the 2014–15 year.

Transportation

Maritime transport

There is marine freight service at the Port of Rochester on Lake Ontario, which is connected to the Atlantic Ocean via the Saint Lawrence Seaway.

A short-lived, high-speed passenger/vehicle ferry Spirit of Ontario I built in Australia, nicknamed The Breeze or The Fast Ferry, linked Rochester to Toronto across Lake Ontario. Canadian American Transportation Systems (CATS) was the company in charge of the Fast Ferry operations. The Spirit of Ontario I had a delayed arrival on April 29, 2004, as a result of hitting a pier in New York City on April 5, 2004, and was finally officially christened on June 16, 2004, at the Port of Rochester. The Fast Ferry was bought by the City of Rochester in an attempt to save the project. The Fast Ferry operated between June 17, 2004, and December 12, 2005, and cost the city $42.5 million. The project was initially well received by the inhabitants of Rochester.

Considerable effort was spent by inhabitants of Rochester to build up the waterfront to embrace the idea as well as to capitalize on potential tourism which was estimated to be an additional 75,000 tourists per month. In the first three months of operation, the fast ferry had carried about 140,000 people between Rochester and Toronto. A second Fast Ferry was proposed by CATS on August 27, 2004, which would have cost an additional $100 million. There were a number of problems concerning the ship's engine, the lack of mutual building up of waterfronts in Toronto and the inability of the city to put pressure on the company responsible for the production of the Fast Ferry. This resulted in the failure of the project. It was sold to Förde Reederei Seetouristik, a German company, for $30 million.

Air transport

Rochester is served by the Frederick Douglass Greater Rochester International Airport (GRIA). Scheduled air service is provided by American, Allegiant, Delta, Frontier, JetBlue, Southwest, Spirit, and United.

In 2010, the GRIA was ranked the 14th-least expensive airport in the United States by Cheapflights. This was considered a major achievement for the county and the airport authority; as recently as 2003, Rochester's ticket prices were among the highest in the country, ranking as high as fourth in 1999.

FedEx founder Fred Smith has stated in several articles that Xerox's development of the copier, and its need to quickly get parts to customers, was one of the economic issues that led him to pioneer the overnight delivery business in 1971. Because Xerox manufactured its copiers in Rochester, the city was one of the original 25 cities FedEx served on its first night of operations on April 17, 1973.

In 2016, Governor Andrew Cuomo announced a $63.4 million project to renovate the GRIA. The renovations include a large canopy extending over both main entrances, solar panels, a rainwater collection system, and modern communication and security enhancements.  All construction was completed by October 2018.

Rails and mass transit

Rail service to Rochester is provided by the Louise M. Slaughter Rochester Station, served by Amtrak's Empire Service between New York City and Niagara Falls, the Maple Leaf between New York City and Toronto, and the Lake Shore Limited between New York City/Boston and Chicago. Prior to 1965, Rochester had a smaller station reminiscent of New York City's "Grand Central Terminal". It was among Claude Fayette Bragdon's best works in Rochester, New York. The current station is modeled after Bragdon's work and named in honor of former longtime congresswomen Louise Slaughter.

Rochester used to be a major stop on several railroad lines. It was served by the New York Central Railroad which served Chicago and Buffalo to the west and Albany and New York City to the east and southeast. The Buffalo, Rochester and Pittsburgh Railway (absorbed by the Baltimore and Ohio Railroad) served Buffalo and Pittsburgh until 1955. A rail route to Salamanca in southern New York State afforded connections in Salamanca to southwestern and southeastern New York State. The last long-distance train in a southern direction was the Northern Express/Southern Express that went to Harrisburg, Pennsylvania, via Canandaigua, Elmira and Williamsport; service ended in 1971. Also serving Rochester was the Erie Railroad and Lehigh Valley Railroad.

Amtrak (passenger) and freight lines provide rail service to Rochester. Rochester has intercity and transcontinental bus service via Greyhound and Trailways.

Local bus service in Rochester and its county suburbs is provided by the Rochester-Genesee Regional Transportation Authority (RGRTA) via its Regional Transit Service (RTS) subsidiary. RTS also provides suburban service outside the immediate Rochester area and runs smaller transportation systems in outlying counties, such as WATS (Wayne Area Transportation System). All RTS routes are based out of the RTS Transit Center on Mortimer Street.

From 1927 to 1957, Rochester had a light rail underground transit system called the Rochester Subway. It was the smallest city in the world to have one. The subway, which was operated by the Rochester Transit Corporation, was shut down in 1956. The eastern half of the subway past Court Street became the Eastern Expressway with the western end of the open cut being filled in 1976. The tunnel was last used for freight service by Gannett Company to bring paper to the printing presses for the Democrat and Chronicle in 1997. Over the years there have been privately sponsored proposals put forth that encourage the region to support a new system, possibly using some of the old tunnel. One includes converting the Broad Street bridge tunnel—the former canal aqueduct—into an enhanced pedestrian corridor, which would also include a Rochester Transportation Museum, and a tram system.

The former canal and subway tunnel have become a frequent source of debate. Homeless people trespass in the tunnels. The city has considered multiple solutions for the space including recreating a canal way, putting the subway system back in or filling the tunnels entirely. The plan to fill the tunnels in completely generated criticism, as the cost of filling would not generate or leverage economic development. The western end of the tunnel was filled in to the former Baltimore and Ohio Railroad turnout in 2010 as part of a redevelopment of the above street and the eastern end of the tunnel is undergoing redevelopment. The Broad Street aqueduct and most famous part of the tunnel is on the National Register of Historic Places being added in 1976.

Major highways and roads

Three exits off the New York State Thruway (Interstate 90) serve Rochester. Rochester has an extensive system of limited-access highways (called 'expressways' or just 'highways', but never 'freeways') which connects all parts of the city and the Thruway.

Rochester's expressway system, conceived in the 1950s, was designed as two concentric circles with feeder expressways from the west, south and east. The system allows for quick travel within the metropolitan area and a lack of the traffic gridlock typically found in cities of comparable size; in part this is because the system was designed to accommodate rapid travel between the suburbs and downtown, and also because it was built when the city's population was over 330,000, whereas today it is a full third less.

The Outer Loop circles just outside the city limits while the former Inner Loop once circled around the immediate downtown area within the city (the easternmost sector was closed in 2015). From the west are Lake Ontario State Parkway, NY-531 and I-490; Interstate 390 feeds from the south; and NY-104, NY-441, and I-490 approach from the east.

In 2016, the City of Rochester launched the Pace Car Program. "Pace Car drivers sign a pledge to drive within the speed limit, drive courteously, yield to pedestrians and be mindful of bicyclists and others on the street."

Later expressway proposals
In the early 1970s, the Genesee Expressway Task Force, City leaders, and NYSDOT studied the feasibility of connecting the outer and inner Loops with a new southern expressway. The proposed route extended north from the I-390 and I-590 interchange in Brighton, cutting through Rochester's Swillburg neighborhood. In 1972, consultants Berger Lehman Associates recommended a new 'Busway', an expressway with dedicated bus lanes, similar to Bus Rapid Transit. The expressway extension was never built.

Three Interstate Highways run through the City of Rochester:

 Interstate 390 (Genesee Expressway)
I-390 runs south–north, crossing I-90 (exit 46) and routing north through Rochester's western suburbs. Its northern end is at I-490, however, it continues north as NY-390 until it merges into the Lake Ontario State Parkway. South of I-90, I-390 runs to Avoca, where it meets with U.S. Route 15 and the Southern Tier Expressway, I-86.
 Interstate 490 (Western/Eastern Expressway)
I-490 runs west–east through Rochester, starting at Le Roy and ending in Victor. It interchanges with the two other Interstates in Rochester: I-390 at the western city limit and I-590 at the eastern limit, as well as connecting at both ends with the Thruway, I-90 (exits 47 and 45). In July 2007, a new bridge over the Genesee River was completed and named the Frederick Douglass–Susan B. Anthony Memorial Bridge.
 Interstate 590
I-590 runs south–north through Rochester's eastern suburbs. Its southern end is at I-390, while the northern terminus is at I-490; the highway continues north to the shore of Lake Ontario as NY-590.
In decreasing usage is the term "Can of Worms", referring to the previously dangerous at-grade intersection of Interstate 490 and expressway NY-590 on the eastern edge of the Rochester city limits, bordering the suburb of Brighton. In the 1980s, a multimillion-dollar project created a system of overpasses and ramps that reduced the danger but resulted in the loss of certain exits.

New York State Route Expressways:

 New York State Route 104 (Irondequoit-Wayne County Expressway, West Ridge Road)
NY 104 – Just east of the NY 590 interchange, NY 104 becomes the Irondequoit-Wayne County Expressway and crosses the Irondequoit Bay Bridge. On the other side of the Bay Bridge, in the town of Webster, NY 104 has exits before returning to an at-grade highway at Basket Road.
 New York State Route 390
NY 390 is an extension of Interstate 390 from the I-390/I-490 interchange in Gates. The northern terminus is at the Lake Ontario State Parkway in Greece, less than a mile from the Lake Ontario shoreline.
 New York State Route 590
NY 590 is a limited-access extension of Interstate 590 that runs from an interchange between Interstate 490 and I-590 on the Brighton/Rochester border. The northern terminus is at Culver Road in Irondequoit, near Sea Breeze (the western shore of Irondequoit Bay at Lake Ontario).
 Inner Loop
The Inner Loop Runs from Interstate 490 to Main Street on the north end and from 490 to Monroe Avenue at the south end. Formerly a loop, the eastern end was demolished and replaced with a surface road between 2014 and 2017. Unsigned reference New York State Route 940T begins and ends at Interstate 490, and the rest of the Loop is part of I-490 between exits 13 and 15, including the Frederick Douglass–Susan B. Anthony Memorial Bridge. This expressway is commonly used to define the borders of downtown Rochester.

New York State Parkways:

 Lake Ontario State Parkway
Lake Ontario State Parkway travels from Lakeside Beach State Park in Carlton, Orleans County. The eastern end is at Lake Avenue in the city of Rochester in Monroe County.

Notable people
See List of people from Rochester, New York
Notable individuals who were born in and/or lived in Rochester include American social reformer and women's rights activist Susan B. Anthony, African-American social reformer and abolitionist Frederick Douglass, and Kodak founder George Eastman.

Sister cities
Rochester has twelve sister cities, as designated by Sister Cities International. They are all dedicated by a branched concrete walkway over the Genesee River, dubbed the Sister Cities Bridge (known as the Frank and Janet Lamb Bridge since October 2006):

Rochester's sister cities are:

 Rennes, France (1958)
 Würzburg, Germany (1964)
 Caltanissetta, Italy (1965)
 Rehovot, Israel (1972)
 Kraków, Poland (1973)
 Bamako, Mali (1975)
 Waterford, Ireland (1983)
 Veliky Novgorod, Russia (1990)
 Hamamatsu, Japan (1996)
 Puerto Plata, Dominican Republic (1997)
 Xianyang, China (2007)
 Alytus, Lithuania (2009)

See also
 USS Rochester, 3 ships

Notes

References

Further reading
 Keene, Michael. Folklore and Legends of Rochester: The Mystery of Hoodoo Corner and Other Tales (2011) excerpt and text search
 McKelvey, Blake.  Rochester on the Genesee: The Growth of a City (1993) excerpt and text search; 292 pp; a brief history by the leading specialist

External links

 
 Greater Rochester Visitors Association
 

 
Cities in Monroe County, New York
Cities in New York (state)
Cities in Rochester metropolitan area, New York
County seats in New York (state)
New York (state) populated places on the Genesee River
Populated places established in the 1810s
Populated places on Lake Ontario in the United States
Ukrainian communities in the United States
History of Christianity in the United States
Populated places established in 1803